Harry Livingston Hillman Jr. (September 8, 1881 – August 9, 1945) was an American athlete and winner of three gold medals at the 1904 Summer Olympics.

Biography
Born in Brooklyn, New York, Hillman was a member of three Olympic teams at the turn of the century. He also was a coach at Dartmouth College.

Hillman won three gold medals at the 1904 Olympics in St. Louis, Missouri, taking the flat 400 metres, the 200 metres hurdles and the 400 metres hurdles. He had Olympic record times in all three events, but Hillman tripped one hurdle in the 400 metres, which meant that his time of 53.0 seconds could not be counted as a world record (the record had stood at 57.2 seconds since 1891). In addition, the race was run over hurdles that were too low at 76 centimetres instead of the normal 91,4.

En route to Greece for the 1906 Summer Olympics, Hillman was one of a half-dozen athletes who were injured by an enormous wave that washed over the deck of the ship. He finished fifth in the 400 metres, his only event that year.

Hillman won a silver medal in the 400 metres hurdles at the 1908 Summer Olympics, setting a short-lived record in the second round. He and Charles Bacon of the USA went over the last hurdle simultaneously, but Bacon won the run to the tape to win in a world record 55.0 seconds. Hillman's time in the race was 55.3 seconds.

On April 24, 1909, Hillman and Lawson Robertson set a record that has never been equalled, running the  three-legged race in 11.0 seconds. He won four Amateur Athletic Union titles, two each in the 200 metres and 400 metres hurdles.

The track coach at Dartmouth College from 1910 until his death, Hillman advised hurdlers to swallow raw eggs, which he believed to be "excellent for the wind and stomach." He was on the Olympic track and field coaching staff in 1924, 1928, and 1932 Summer Olympics, as well as acting as trainer for the American Davis Cup team in 1935. One of his most famous athletes was Canadian hurdler Earl Thomson, the winner of the gold medal in the 110 metres hurdles at the 1920 Summer Olympics. In 1930 Hillman, along with Thomson and Harold Barron, was involved in the design of a new safer hurdle, with a view to reducing the danger of bad falls and injuries.

Hillman died at Hanover, New Hampshire.

References

External links
 
 
 

1881 births
1945 deaths
Sportspeople from Brooklyn
Track and field athletes from New York City
American male hurdlers
American male sprinters
Athletes (track and field) at the 1904 Summer Olympics
Athletes (track and field) at the 1906 Intercalated Games
Athletes (track and field) at the 1908 Summer Olympics
Dartmouth Big Green track and field coaches
Olympic gold medalists for the United States in track and field
Olympic silver medalists for the United States in track and field
Medalists at the 1908 Summer Olympics
Medalists at the 1904 Summer Olympics